Kerlin Gallery is a contemporary commercial art gallery in Dublin, Ireland.

History
Originally opened in 1988, the gallery's current space was designed in 1994 by architect John Pawson. It is located in central Dublin and has 3,600 square feet of gallery space spread over two floors. In 2015, the Artnet website included the gallery in a list of "Europe’s Top 55 Galleries". David Fitzgerald, Darragh Hogan, and John Kennedy are the gallery's directors.

In 2018, the gallery donated a number of works to the Irish Museum of Modern Art.

Selected exhibitions
Curated group exhibitions include Newfound Landscape (1998), with Uta Barth, Oliver Boberg, Walter Niedermayer, and Esko Manniko; Kin, with John Currin, Cheryl Donegan, Ellen Gallagher, and Sean Landers, and Architecture Schmarchitecture (2003) with Isa Genzken, Liam Gillick, Roger Hiorns, Jim Lambie, Sarah Moris, and Thomas Scheibitz.

In 2019, the gallery organised Shadowplay with Willie Doherty, Aleana Egan, Liam Gillick, Siobhán Hapaska, and Callum Innes. The title is derived from the song of the same name on Joy Division's Unknown Pleasures album.

References

External links

Art museums and galleries in the Republic of Ireland
Arts in Dublin (city)
Contemporary art galleries in Ireland
Tourist attractions in Dublin (city)
Art galleries established in 1988
1988 establishments in Ireland